Brzeżno is a village in Świdwin County, West Pomeranian Voivodeship, Poland.

Brzezno may also refer to:

In Greater Poland Voivodeship (west-central Poland):
Brzezno, Greater Poland Voivodeship
Brzeźno, Czarnków-Trzcianka County
Brzeźno, Konin County
Brzeźno, Poznań County
Brzeźno, Wągrowiec County

In Kuyavian-Pomeranian Voivodeship (north-central Poland):
Brzeźno, Aleksandrów County 
Brzeźno, Lipno County
Brzeźno, Świecie County
Brzeźno, Toruń County

In Lubusz Voivodeship (west Poland):
Brzeźno, Gorzów County
Brzeźno, Międzyrzecz County
Brzeźno, Sulęcin County

In Pomeranian Voivodeship (north Poland):
Brzeźno, a district of Gdańsk
Brzeźno, Człuchów County
Brzeźno, Tczew County

In West Pomeranian Voivodeship (north-west Poland):
Brzeźno, Białogard County
Brzeźno, Gmina Barwice
Brzeźno, Gmina Szczecinek

In other voivodeships:

Brzeźno, Lower Silesian Voivodeship (south-west Poland)
Brzeźno, Lublin Voivodeship (east Poland)
Brzeźno, Masovian Voivodeship (east-central Poland)
Brzeźno, Podlaskie Voivodeship (north-east Poland)
Brzeźno, Świętokrzyskie Voivodeship (south-central Poland)
Brzeźno, Warmian-Masurian Voivodeship (north Poland)

See also 
 Brzeżno Łyńskie, Warmian-Masurian Voivodeship